Contiki is a New Zealand-based tour company that caters to 18 to 35-year-olds, offering over 350 different tours in over 75 countries in Europe, Australia, New Zealand, North America, South America, Africa, the Middle East, and Asia. It is a subsidiary of The Travel Corporation. Its tours historically had a reputation for partying; however, it also operates wellness trips culturally immersive experiences that focus less on alcohol, which are more popular with Generation Z.

The company owns lodging facilities in Europe, including the Chateau De Cruix, a 16th century castle in the Beaujolais wine region, and the Gasthof Schoneck in the Austrian Tyrol.

The name "Contiki" comes from the portmanteau 'Con' from the word 'Continent' and 'Tiki'; from the Māori referring to the first man, often symbolised as a pendant known as hei-tiki. It can also be attributed to the New Zealand slang 'Tiki-tour' describing taking a longer route to a destination in order to explore.

History 
In 1962, when New Zealander John Anderson was alone and without much money he devised a plan so that he would not have to travel alone and could see Europe for free. He put a deposit on a minibus, gathered a group of people to travel with, and spent 12 weeks exploring Europe with his group. At the end of the trip, he unsuccessfully tried to sell the minibus. As a result, he decided to promote his Europe trip again, and this time he was able to fit two trips into the summer season. The first tours were booked by 19- to 29-year-olds, starting the tradition of Contiki Holidays being for youth travellers.

Incidents
In September 2011, a 23-year old Australian woman was found dead on a tour in Italy after falling ill.

In December 2016, one of the company's vans went off a cliff on the way to a surf beach in the Gili Islands, killing one passenger and injuring two others.

External links

References 

1962 establishments in New Zealand
Companies based in Anaheim, California
Travel and holiday companies of New Zealand
Travel and holiday companies of the United States